Sárok is a village in Baranya county, Hungary. Residents are Magyars, with minority of Serbs.

Populated places in Baranya County
Serb communities in Hungary